Rev. George Edmond Pierce (September 9, 1794 – May 27, 1871) was an American minister and the second President of Western Reserve College, now Case Western Reserve University.

Pierce was born in Southbury, Conn, September 9, 1794. His father was Samuel Pierce, and his mother Martha, daughter of Robert Edmond, from Ireland.  He graduated from Yale College in 1816.  After graduation, he taught in Fairfield (Conn.) Academy for two years, and was for the next three years a member of Andover Theological Seminary. He was ordained pastor of the Congregational Church in Harwinton, Conn., July 10, 1822, and continued so until June 1834, when he was dismissed to accept the Presidency of the Western Reserve College, in Hudson, Ohio. He entered on his new duties in the next month, and remained in office twenty one years. In 1843, Pierce began the Medical Department of Western Reserve College, known today as the Case Western Reserve University School of Medicine.  After his resignation his residence continued in Hudson, till his sudden death, May 27, 1871.

Dr. Pierce was married, December 1, 1824, to Miss Susan Rockwell, daughter of Martin Rockwell, of Colebrook, Conn., who survived him. They had five sons and one daughter: one son died in infancy, and three of the other sons graduated at Western Reserve College.  Dr. Pierce received the degree of Doctor of Divinity from Middlebury College in 1838.

External links
 Case Western Reserve University bio

References

1794 births
1871 deaths
Case Western Reserve University faculty
People from Southbury, Connecticut
American Congregationalist ministers
Yale College alumni
Andover Newton Theological School alumni
Presidents of Case Western Reserve University
19th-century American clergy